Krishnavataram is a 1982 Indian Telugu-language action drama film directed by Bapu starring Krishna Ghattamaneni, Sridevi and Vijayashanti. Produced by Mullapudi Venkata Ramanna, the film had musical score by K. V. Mahadevan.

Cast 
 Krishna Ghattamaneni
 Sridevi
 Vijayashanti
 P. R. Varalakshmi
 K. Vijaya
 Prasadbabu
 Vallam Narasimha Rao
 Bhimaraju

Guest Appearance 
 Kantha Rao
 Allu Ramalingaiah

Soundtrack 

The soundtrack album comprised 5 songs all of which were composed by K. V. Mahadevan.
 "Intlo Eegala Motta" — S. P. Balasubrahmanyam, P. Susheela
 "Konda Gogu Chettu" — S.P.B., P. Susheela
 "Sinnari Navvu" — S.P.B., S. P. Sailaja
 "Melukoraada Krishna" — S.P.B., P. Susheela, S. P. Shailaja
 "Swagatham Guru" — S.P.B.

References

External links 

1980s Telugu-language films
1982 films
Indian action drama films
1980s action drama films
Films directed by Bapu
Films scored by K. V. Mahadevan